Pinchot State Forest is a Pennsylvania State Forest in Pennsylvania Bureau of Forestry District #11. The main offices are located in Lackawanna State Park in North Abington Township in Lackawanna County, Pennsylvania, in the United States.

The forest is located on several tracts in Lackawanna, Luzerne, Wyoming, Susquehanna, and Wayne counties.

The reorganization of Pennsylvania State Forests that took effect , added the southern part of Luzerne County to District #11 (it was previously in the defunct Wyoming State Forest).

History

Depletion of Natural Resources  
Pinchot State Forest was formed in response to the depletion of the forests of Pennsylvania during the mid-to-late 19th century. Conservationists like Dr. Joseph Rothrock feared that the forests would not regrow if they were not managed properly. Lumber and Iron companies had harvested the old-growth forests on a massive scale. They clear cut the forests and left behind nothing but dried tree tops and rotting stumps. The sparks of passing steam locomotives ignited wildfires that prevented the formation of second growth forests. Conservationists feared that the forest would never regrow if there was not a change in the philosophy of forest management. They called for the state to purchase land from the lumber and iron companies and the lumber and iron companies were more than willing to sell their land since that had depleted the natural resources of the forests.

Legislative Response 
A change began in 1895 when Dr. Rothrock was appointed the first commissioner of the Pennsylvania Department of Forests and Waters, the forerunner of today's Pennsylvania Department of Conservation and Natural Resources. The Pennsylvania General Assembly passed legislation in 1897 that authorized the purchase of "unseated lands for forest reservations." This was the beginning of the State Forest system. It was originally known as Lackawanna State Forest.

Expansion and Renaming 
In 2015, Lackawanna State Forest was renamed Pinchot State Forest in honor of Gifford Pinchot.

Gallery
A view of Lackawanna and Luzerne Counties from Pine Hill (in Pinchot State Forest):

Neighboring state forest districts
The U.S. states of New York and New Jersey are to the north and east, respectively
Delaware State Forest (southeast)
Weiser State Forest (south)
Loyalsock State Forest (west)

Nearby state parks
Archbald Pothole State Park in Lackawanna County
Lackawanna State Park in Lackawanna County
Prompton State Park in Wayne County
Salt Springs State Park in Susquehanna County
Varden Conservation Area in Wayne County

References

 
 
 Note: Map showing districts after the July 1, 2005 realignment

Pennsylvania state forests
Protected areas of Lackawanna County, Pennsylvania
Protected areas of Luzerne County, Pennsylvania
Protected areas of Wayne County, Pennsylvania
Protected areas of Wyoming County, Pennsylvania
Protected areas of Susquehanna County, Pennsylvania
Protected areas established in 1902
1902 establishments in Pennsylvania